The Christian Democratic Union (KDS) was a political party in Lithuania.

History
The party was established as the Lithuanian Christian Democratic Union (LKDS). It contested the 1992 elections in an alliance with Young Lithuania, with the alliance winning a single seat, taken by the LKDS. The party won only a single seat in the 1996 elections, and changed its name to "Christian Democratic Union" in the same year. The 2000 elections saw the party retain its single seat, increasing its vote share from 3.2% to 4.2%.

In 2001 it merged with the Lithuanian Christian Democratic Party to form the Lithuanian Christian Democrats.

References

Defunct political parties in Lithuania
Political parties disestablished in 2001
2001 disestablishments in Lithuania